Cambodia is a source, transit, and destination country for human trafficking. The traffickers are reportedly organized crime syndicates, parents, relatives, friends, intimate partners, and neighbors. Despite human trafficking being a crime in Cambodia, the country has a significant child sex tourism problem; some children are sold by their parents, while others are lured by what they think are legitimate job offers like waitressing, but then are forced into prostitution. Children are often held captive, beaten, and starved to force them into prostitution.

In 2022, the U.S. Department of State’s Trafficking in Persons Report downgraded Cambodia to "Tier 3" due to the Cambodian government's failure to meet the minimum standards to eliminate human trafficking and insufficient effort to address human trafficking. Cambodia had previously hovered between Tier 2 and the Tier 2 watch lists.

Survey
A UNICEF survey concluded that 35% of Cambodia's 15,000 prostitutes are children under the age of 16. Almost all of Cambodian brothels are Vietnamese-owned, with most of its prostitutes being of Vietnamese descent and captured sex slaves being of other ethnic groups. Men are trafficked for forced labor in the agriculture, fishing, and construction industries. Women are trafficked for sexual exploitation and forced labor in factories or as domestic servants. Children are trafficked for sexual exploitation and forced labor in organized begging rings, soliciting, and street vending.

Common destinations for trafficking victims are Phnom Penh, Siem Reap, and Sihanoukville.

Conditions
Pimps are reported to imprison young children who are virgins. These children would not be placed to work until they had been presented to a series of bidders, such as high-ranking military officers, politicians, businessmen, and foreign tourists. Young girls working in brothels are in effect, sex slaves; they receive no money, only food, and armed guards stop them from running away. Children are often held captive, beaten, and starved to force them into prostitution.

Cases
In 1995, a 15-year-old child that was trafficked into prostitution in a brothel in the Svay Por district of Battambang was beaten to death.

Child sex trafficking

Children as young as 3 are being sold as slaves for sex. By some estimates, hundreds of thousands of children are bought, sold, or kidnapped around the world each year and then forced to have sex.
ECPAT Cambodia reports that as many as one third of the trafficking victims in prostitution are children.

Foreign child molesters
The MOI reported the arrest of 31 foreign child molesters in Cambodia in 2009.

Laws
A law was passed in January 1997 to curb trafficking in women, with fines of up to $12,000 and prison sentences of up to 20 years for pimps and brothel owners.

In 2008, the Government introduced the Law on Suppression of Human Trafficking and Sexual Exploitation, which criminalizes all forms of trafficking. However, the country remained a source, destination, and transit country for men, women, and children trafficked for sexual exploitation and labor. Children were trafficked domestically for sexual exploitation.

Cambodia is party to several international covenants prohibiting the trafficking of persons and the exploitation of women and children.

Cambodia has continued to assist U.S. law enforcement authorities in the transfer to U.S. custody of Americans who have sexually exploited children in Cambodia.

Anti-Human Trafficking Day
December 12 is observed as National Anti-Human Trafficking Day in Cambodia.

Non-governmental organizations
On the ground in Cambodia, a number of non-governmental organizations and non-profit organizations are working to combat human trafficking. These include AFESIP, the Somaly Mam Foundation, Hagar International, ECPAT, and Agape International Missions. There are also other development partners that work together to fight against human trafficking.

Overseas cyber slaves  
Overseas job scams are rampant in Cambodia. People are lured in by offers of a high-paid job with little to no experience or work visa needed, then held hostage under threats of violence and forced to work as "cyber slaves" in call centers making scam phone calls and other cryptocurrency and online gambling schemes. Vietnamese and citizens from Chinese-speaking countries are most frequently targeted.  People were tortured and can be sold if they refused to scam others.   

On 17 August 2022, 42 Vietnamese victims escaped from the Golden Phoenix casino near the Chrey Thom border checkpoint by swimming across the Binh Di River, resulting in a 16-year-old boy died by drowning. On 17 September 2022, a group of 60 Vietnamese people fled from a casino in Bavet city in Svay Rieng province. Cambodian police later managed to rescue 15 more Vietnamese nationals.

References

External links
Cambodia's child sex crackdown
Cambodia says no to sex tourists
Cambodia tours, hotels must adopt zero tolerance to sex tourism, advocates say
UNIAP Trafficking Estimates Measuring the Extent of Sex Trafficking in Cambodia–2008

 
Cambodia
Cambodia
Human rights abuses in Cambodia
Violence against women in Cambodia
Women's rights in Cambodia